Marcia Yvette Gilbert-Roberts is a Jamaican bureaucrat and diplomat who served as Permanent Secretary in the Ministry of Foreign Affairs and Jamaican Ambassador to several European countries including Germany, Spain and France.

Education 
Gilbert-Roberts was educated at the University of the West Indies, Jamaica where she received a bachelor of Arts degree in Foreign Languages and History and a master’s degree in Psycholinguistics from the University of Besançon, France and later received training in Management of Foreign Affairs and Foreign Trade Issues in the United Kingdom and in Jamaica.

Career 
She started her career in 1986 in the Ministry of Foreign Affairs and Foreign Trade as Deputy Director, Foreign Trade and Deputy Director Political Affairs and served in this position until 1991 when she was appointed Deputy High Commissioner to the Jamaican High Commission in London and served until 1996 when she returned to the Ministry of Foreign Affairs and Foreign Trade as Under-Secretary. In 2002, she was promoted from Under-Secretary to the rank of ambassador and was deployed to the Germany, and was accredited as nonresident ambassador to Slovakia, Switzerland, Holy See, Czech Republic, Hungary, Poland and Israel. During this period, she served as Jamaica Permanent Representative to the Organization for the Prohibition of Chemical Weapons. From 2007 to 2011 she was Jamaica ambassador to France, The Netherlands, Portugal, Belgium, Spain and was Permanent Delegate to UNESCO. After her return home from foreign mission, she was appointed Permanent Secretary in the Ministry of Foreign Affairs serving until 2017 when she retired from service.

Honours 
Justice of the Peace & Lay Magistrate, Jamaica, 2002

Pontifical Knighthood of Dame Grand Cross of the Order of St. Gregory The Great (DCSG) for contribution to international relations awarded, 2005

Order of Distinction in the Rank of Commander awarded by Jamaican National Honour, 2002.

References 

Jamaican diplomats
University of the West Indies alumni
Jamaican justices of the peace
Jamaican women ambassadors
Dames Grand Cross of the Order of St Gregory the Great
Commanders of the Order of Distinction
University of Franche-Comté alumni
Ambassadors of Jamaica to Germany
Ambassadors of Jamaica to Slovakia
Ambassadors of Jamaica to Hungary
Ambassadors of Jamaica to Poland
Ambassadors of Jamaica to Switzerland
Ambassadors of Jamaica to the Holy See
Ambassadors of Jamaica to the Czech Republic
Ambassadors of Jamaica to Israel
Ambassadors of Jamaica to France
Ambassadors of Jamaica to the Netherlands
Ambassadors of Jamaica to Belgium
Ambassadors of Jamaica to Portugal
Ambassadors of Jamaica to Spain
Permanent Representatives of Jamaica to the Organization for the Prohibition of Chemical Weapons
Permanent Delegates of Jamaica to UNESCO